Shunyo E Buke (English: Empty canvas) is a 2005 Bengali film directed by Kaushik Ganguly. The film deals with the psyche of men and women and their physical relationship. After making Waarish Ganguly made this second feature film and this film did well in Kolkata and was appreciated in few film festivals.

Plot
Saumitra, a brilliant painter and sculptor, visits Khajuraho Group of Monuments to draw inspiration and meets Teesta there through a common friend, Anjit who is an artiste too. Love blossoms between them in Kolkata and though their family and economic standards are poles apart, they decide to marry. Teesta breaks away from her rich, blue blood family. On the marriage night Kaushik, to his shock, discovers that Teesta is flat-chested. The shock develops into sense of being cheated, anger and finally hatred. Teesta goes and seeks solution from Sharmistha di, her boss. When Soumitra arrives he is turned away. Soumitra draws a diagram one day and shows the shortcoming of Teesta's body to Joydeep who in turns tells it to Sujoy, Sujoy to Anjit. Teesta hears about this from Anjit. She asks Soumitro not to make a mockery of her any more and asks for a divorce. A few years later Soumitro again comes across Anjit and Teesta with their daughter at the back. Anijit and Teesta stayed in touch and found solace in each other and were married. Teesta tells Soumitro that her husband is quite happy with her as well as her daughter in spite of her physical shortcoming and they have a very happy married life. Soumitra regrets the offences that he had committed a few years back and he feels guilty and ashamed.

Cast
Churni Ganguly as Teesta
Kaushik Sen as Saumitra
Kharaj Mukherjee as Joydeep 
Tota Roy Choudhury as Arijit
Biswajit Chakraborty
Rajesh Sharma
Sudip Mitra

Guest appearance
Roopa Ganguly as Sharmisthadi
Soma Dey
Deepankar De

Crew
Direction, story, screenplay: Kaushik Ganguly
Chief assistant directors: Abhijit Chowdhury, Amitava Chakraborty
Assistant directors: Tarun Chakraborty, Joydeep Mukherjee
Production: Forthright media and entertainment
Executive producer: Shaswati Guha Thakurta
Art direction: Samir Kundu
Make up: Sekhar Banerjee
Camera: Adinath Das
Editing: Subrata Roy
Background music: Chiradeep Dasgupta
Music direction: Goutam Banerjee
Sound recording: Nanda Kishore Ghosh
Re-recording: Nataraj Manna
Playback singer: Kharaj Mukherjee
Stills: Samir Sikdar, Shibhnath Karmakar
Costume planning: Churni Ganguly
Calligraphy: Goutam Barat

References

External links 
 

2005 films
Bengali-language Indian films
Films directed by Kaushik Ganguly
2000s Bengali-language films